The 1872 Boston Red Stockings season was the 2nd season of the franchise. They won the National Association championship.

Managed by Harry Wright, Boston finished with a record of 39–8 to win the pennant by 7.5 games. Pitcher Al Spalding started all 48 of the Red Stockings' games and led the NA with 38 wins. Second baseman Ross Barnes won the league batting title with a .430 batting average. Harry Wright, Al Spalding, and shortstop George Wright have all been elected into the Baseball Hall of Fame.

Regular season

Season standings

Record vs. opponents

Roster

Player stats

Batting

Starters by position
Note: Pos = Position; G = Games played; AB = At bats; H = Hits; Avg. = Batting average; HR = Home runs; RBI = Runs batted in

Other batters
Note: G = Games played; AB = At bats; H = Hits; Avg. = Batting average; HR = Home runs; RBI = Runs batted in

Pitching

Starting pitchers
Note: G = Games pitched; IP = Innings pitched; W = Wins; L = Losses; ERA = Earned run average; SO = Strikeouts

Relief pitchers
Note: G = Games pitched; IP = Innings pitched; W = Wins; L = Losses; ERA = Earned run average; SO = Strikeouts

References 

1872 Boston Red Stockings season at Baseball Reference

Boston Red Stockings seasons
Boston Red Stockings
Boston Red Stockings
Boston Red Stockings
19th century in Boston